Ivo Svoboda (6 April 1948 – 23 February 2017) was a Czech politician and economist who served as 3rd Finance Minister of the Czech Republic from 1998 to 1999 in government of Prime Minister Miloš Zeman.

Svoboda started his political career as a Deputy in the Czech National Council (from 1990 to 1992). Since 1997, he was the Deputy Chairman of the Board of the company Liberta in Mělník. From 1997 to 1999, he served as the Deputy Chairman of the Czech Social Democratic Party. He became the Minister of Finance in July 1998 as his party won the national election, following a campaign promising voters a corruption-free government. In July 1999, police announced their intention to start prosecution proceedings on criminal charges against Svoboda while he was still in the Cabinet. His term as Minister of Finance came to an end less than a week later, as he was sacked by President Václav Havel.

Svoboda was sentenced to 5 years in prison in 2005 due to his involvement in tunneling of the Liberta company, becoming the first government minister following the Velvet Revolution to receive such a sentence. He left prison in October 2008, after having served three years of his sentence.

References

External links
 Official biography (Government of the Czech Republic)

1948 births
2017 deaths
Czech Social Democratic Party MPs
Finance ministers of the Czech Republic
Czech criminals
Charles University alumni